Carlo II Manfredi (1439–1484) was a lord of Faenza, in northern Italy.

Born in Faenza, Romagna, he was the son of Astorre II Manfredi. He succeeded the latter in 1468 as Papal vicar in the city and its neighbourhood. In 1471 Carlo married Costanza da Varano, daughter of Rodolfo da Varano, lord of Camerino.

He left the lordship of Faenza in 1477, and died in Rimini in 1484.

Manfredi, Carlo 2
Manfredi, Carlo 2
Carlo 2
Manfredi, Carlo 2